The Church of the Archangels Michael and Gabriel is a Greek-Catholic church in Șurdești village, Șișești Commune, Maramureș County, Romania. Built in 1721, it is one of eight buildings that make up the wooden churches of Maramureș UNESCO World Heritage Site, and is also listed as a historic monument by the country's Ministry of Culture and Religious Affairs.

See also
Catholic Church in Romania

References

Surdesti
Churches completed in 1766
18th-century Catholic church buildings
Surdesti
Greek-Catholic churches in Romania